Anne Vondeling (2 March 1916 – 22 November 1979) was a Dutch politician of the Labour Party (PvdA) and agronomist.

Vondeling studied Agronomy at the Wageningen Agricultural College obtaining a Master of Science in Engineering degree and worked as a researcher at his alma mater before finishing his thesis and graduated as a Doctor of Engineering in Agricultural engineering. Vondeling worked as an agronomist and agricultural engineer in Friesland from November 1940 until July 1945 and as a director of an agricultural firm in Leeuwarden from July 1945 until January 1958. Vondeling became a Member of the House of Representatives shortly after the election of 1946 on 25 July 1946 and served as a frontbencher and spokesperson for Agriculture. Vondeling was appointed as Minister of Agriculture, Fisheries and Food Supplies in the Cabinet Drees III following a cabinet reshuffle taking office on 13 January 1958. The Cabinet Drees III fell just 11 months later and was replaced on 22 December 1958. Shortly thereafter Labour Leader Willem Drees announced his retirement and Vondeling served as one of the Lijsttrekkers (top candidates) for the election of 1959. After the election Vondeling return to the House of Representatives on 20 March 1959 and served as a frontbencher and spokesperson for Finances. Vondeling also worked as a professor of Agricultural science and International relations at the University of Groningen from January 1960 until January 1963. After the Labour Leader and Parliamentary leader Jaap Burger announced he was stepping down Vondeling was anonymously selected as his successor on 16 September 1962.

For the election of 1963 Vondeling served again as one of the Lijsttrekkers. After the fall of the Cabinet Marijnen a successful cabinet formation formed the Cabinet Cals with Vondeling appointed as Deputy Prime Minister and Minister of Finance taking office on 14 April 1965. In September 1966 Vondeling unexpectedly announced that he was stepping down as Leader but continued to serve in the cabinet. The cabinet Cals fell just one year into its term after a major political crisis and was replaced on 22 November 1966. After the election of 1967 Vondeling returned to the House of Representatives on 23 February 1967 and served again as a frontbencher and spokesperson for Finances. Vondeling also served as Party Chairman from 7 March 1969 until 1 May 1971. After the election of 1972 Vondeling was elected as House of Representatives on 7 December 1972. After the election of 1977 Vondeling was re-elected as Speaker of the House of Representatives. In May 1979 Vondeling announced that he would stand for the European Parliament election of 1979 and would resigned from the House of Representatives. After the European election Vondeling was elected as a Member of the European Parliament and became Delegation leader on 17 July 1979. On 22 November 1979 Vondeling died after suffering a fatal car crash in Mechelen, Belgium at 63. The Anne Vondeling prize is given annually to journalists who write in a clear manner concerning political subjects.

Decorations

References

External links

Official
  Dr.Ir. A. (Anne) Vondeling Parlement & Politiek

 
 

 
 

1916 births
1979 deaths
Agriculturalists
Agricultural engineers
Chairmen of the Labour Party (Netherlands)
Commanders Crosses of the Order of Merit of the Federal Republic of Germany
Commanders of the Order of the Netherlands Lion
Deputy Prime Ministers of the Netherlands
Dutch accountants
Dutch agronomists
Dutch civil engineers
Dutch people of World War II
Grand Officers of the Order of Orange-Nassau
Grand Officiers of the Légion d'honneur
International relations scholars
Labour Party (Netherlands) MEPs
Labour Party (Netherlands) politicians
Members of the House of Representatives (Netherlands)
Members of the Royal Netherlands Academy of Arts and Sciences
MEPs for the Netherlands 1979–1984
Ministers of Agriculture of the Netherlands
Ministers of Finance of the Netherlands
People from Leeuwarden
People from Ooststellingwerf
Recipients of the Grand Cross of the Order of Leopold II
Road incident deaths in Belgium
Speakers of the House of Representatives (Netherlands)
Academic staff of the University of Groningen
Wageningen University and Research alumni
20th-century Dutch civil servants
20th-century Dutch educators
20th-century Dutch engineers
20th-century Dutch politicians
20th-century Dutch scientists